Dark City may refer to:

Film
 Dark City (1950 film), American film noir crime film
 Dark City (1990 film), independent film
 Dark City (1998 film), neo-noir science fiction film

Music
 "Dark City" the seventh track from Machinae Supremacy's 2008 album Overworld
 "Dark City" the sixth track from Iced Earth's 2011 album Dystopia

See also
 The City Dark, 2011 documentary film